Heaven in the Real World is the sixth studio album by American contemporary Christian music singer and songwriter Steven Curtis Chapman released on July 5, 1994, by Sparrow Records.

It was certified gold by the end of the year, nominated for a 1995 Grammy award, and went platinum on February 7, 1997. The title song received the 1995 Gospel Music Association award for best Pop/Contemporary Song of the Year, and the album earned Pop/Contemporary Album of the Year, at the 25th GMA Dove Awards.

Track listing
All songs written by Steven Curtis  Chapman, except where noted.
 "Heaven in the Real World" – 4:50
 "King of the Jungle" – 4:55
 "Dancing with the Dinosaur" – 4:46
 "The Mountain" (Chapman, Geoff Moore) – 4:56
 "Treasure of You" (Chapman, Moore) – 4:41
 "Love and Learn" – 4:09
 "Burn the Ships" (Chapman, James Elliot) – 4:56
 "Remember Your Chains" – 5:22
 "Heartbeat of Heaven" – 5:07
 "Still Listening" – 4:32
 "Facts Are Facts" (Chapman, Moore) – 3:30
 "Miracle of Mercy" – 2:39
 "Heartbeat of Heaven" (reprise) – 0:57

Personnel 
 Steven Curtis Chapman – lead vocals, backing vocals (1-5, 7, 9, 10, 11, 13), acoustic guitars (1, 4, 6, 7, 8, 10), dobro (2), electric guitars (10), classical guitar (12)
 Phil Naish – keyboards
 Dann Huff – electric guitars (1-9, 11, 13), classical guitar solo (6, 9, 13), acoustic guitar solo (8), additional electric guitars (10), slide guitar solo (11)
 Dan Dugmore – dobro (4), steel guitar (6)
 Leland Sklar – bass (1–9, 11, 13)
 Danny O'Lannerghty – fretless bass (12)
 John Robinson – drums (1–9, 11, 13)
 Mark Hammond – drum programming (2), percussion (3, 4)
 Paulinho da Costa – percussion (9, 10, 12, 13)
 Barry Green – trombone (2)
 Chris McDonald – trombone (2), horn arrangements (2)
 Jeff Bailey – trumpet (2)
 Mike Haynes – trumpet (2)
 Jeff Mac – wave sequencing (3)
 David Naish – "pterodactyl" overdub (3)
 Conni Ellisor – string arrangements and conductor (6, 9, 12, 13)
 Carl Gorodetsky – concertmaster (6, 9, 13)
 The Nashville String Machine – strings (6, 9, 13)
 John Catchings – cello (12)
 Anthony LaMarchina – cello (12)
 Bob Mason – cello (12)
 Hezekiah Walker and The Love Fellowship Crusade Choir – choir (1, 2)
 Michael Gleason – backing vocals (1–5, 7, 9, 10, 11, 13)
 Mark Heimermann – backing vocals (1, 2, 5, 7)
 Michael Mellett – backing vocals (3, 4, 9, 10, 11, 13)

Voice-overs on "Heaven in the Real World"
 James Isaac Elliot, Steve LePard, Brad Winget and Charles Colson

Children's choir on "Still Listening"
 Emily Chapman, Caleb Chapman and Will Franklin Chapman

Shoutback on "Facts Are Facts"
 Calvin Bottoms, Dan Brunelle, Steven Curtis Chapman, Dave Huffman, Dennis Kurtilla and Phil Naish

Production 
 Phil Naish – producer 
 Steven Curtis Chapman – producer 
 Peter York – executive producer
 Dan Raines – executive producer
 Ed Cherney – instrumental track recording engineer
 Schnee Studio (North Hollywood, California) – instrumental track recording location, additional recording location
 John Hendrickson – assistant engineer, additional engineer, mix assistant
 Ronnie Brookshire – overdub and vocal recording engineer
 Studio at Mole End (Franklin, Tennessee) – overdub and vocal recording location
 The Hit Factory (New York City, New York) – additional recording location
 Capitol Studios (Hollywood, California) – additional recording location
 Quad Studios (Nashville, Tennessee) – additional recording location
 Mid-Town Tone and Volume (Nashville, Tennessee) – additional recording location
 North Beach Studio (Franklin, Tennessee) – additional recording location
 Dan Garcia – additional engineer
 Jay Healy – additional engineer
 Todd Robbins – additional engineer, assistant engineer 
 Jeremy Smith – additional engineer
 Lars Aakre – assistant engineer
 Dave Dillbeck – assistant engineer
 Peter Doell – assistant engineer
 Koji Egawa – assistant engineer
 Bill Schnee – mixing at Schnee Studio (North Hollywood, California)
 Doug Sax – mastering at The Mastering Lab (Los Angeles, California)
 Bridgett Evans O'Lannerghty – production coordinator
 Karen Philpott – creative design
 East-West Design Group (Nashville, Tennessee) – design
 Gerhart Yurkovic – cover photography 
 E.J. Carr – additional photos
 John Guider – stock photos
 Robert Glover – stock photos
 Skip O'Rourke – stock photos
 Johnny Villanueva – hair and make-up
 Jeffrey Tay – stylist

References 

Steven Curtis Chapman albums
1994 albums
Sparrow Records albums